Sacha Theocharis (born 19 November 1990) is a French freestyle skier. He competed in the 2018 Winter Olympics.

References

1990 births
Living people
People from Bron
Freestyle skiers at the 2018 Winter Olympics
Freestyle skiers at the 2022 Winter Olympics
French male freestyle skiers
Olympic freestyle skiers of France
Université Savoie-Mont Blanc alumni
Sportspeople from Lyon Metropolis